American R&B-pop singer and actress Mya Harrison released her self-titled debut album in 1998 under Interscope Records. It spawned the singles "It's All About Me", "Movin' On", and "My First Night with You". The album and its success helped her score Soul Train Music Award nominations for Best R&B/Soul or Rap New Artist and Best R&B/Soul Album – Female, a NAACP Image Award nomination for Outstanding New Artist, and a Billboard Music Award nomination for New R&B/Hip-Hop Artist of the Year. Her guest featured vocals on "Ghetto Supastar (That Is What You Are)" led to her first Grammy nomination for Best Rap Performance by a Duo or Group.

In 2000, Mya released her second studio album Fear of Flying. The album spawned the single "Case of the Ex" and scored two nominations: Soul Train Music Award for Best R&B/Soul Album, Female and Music of Black Origin Award for Best Album. In 2001, alongside Christina Aguilera, P!nk, and Lil’ Kim, she covered "Lady Marmalade". Their rendition was a global hit and spent five weeks atop the Billboard Hot 100. Its success led to accolades in 2001 and 2002, including a Grammy Award for Best Pop Collaboration with Vocals. Harrison's participation in the musical Chicago earned her a Screen Actor Guild Award and Critics' Choice Movie Award for Best Acting Ensemble.

Harrison released her third studio album Moodring in 2003. It earned her two MTV Video Music Award nominations for Best Dance Video and Best Choreography. At the 2005 MTV Movie Awards, Harrison scored a nomination for Best Frightened Performance, for her role of Jenny Tate in the horror film Cursed. She was honored in 2006 at the Palm Beach International Film Festival, receiving the Cross Over Award (from singer to actor). Her eighth independent project Smoove Jones received a Grammy nomination for Best R&B Album at the 59th Annual Grammy Awards. She has won over 27 awards from 68 nominations.

ACCA Awards

ALMA Awards

Billboard Music Awards

Billboard Music Video Awards

Broadcast Film Critics Association Award

Founded in 1995, the BFCA presents its Critics' Choice Awards each year to honor the finest achievements in film making. Mýa has won one award.

Celebrity Catwalk

Channel V Thailand Music Video Awards

G-Phoria

Gold Derby Awards

Grammy Awards

The Grammy Awards are awarded annually by the National Academy of Recording Arts and Sciences. Mya has won one award from three nominations.

Juice TV Awards

Lady of Soul

MOBO

The MOBO Awards (an acronym for Music of Black Origin) were established in 1996 by Kanya King. They are held annually in the United Kingdom to recognize artists of any race or nationality performing music of black origin. Mya has won one award from two nominations.

MTV Movie Awards

MTV Video Music Awards

The MTV Video Music Awards were established in 1984 by MTV to celebrate the top music videos of the year. Mýa has won two awards from ten nominations.

MTV Asia Awards

MTV Europe Music Awards

The MTV Europe Music Awards were established in 1994 by MTV Europe to celebrate the most popular music videos in Europe.

MTV Video Music Awards Japan

The Music Factory Awards

My VH1 Music Awards

National Film & Television Awards

NAACP Image Awards

Online Film Critics Society Awards

Online Film & Television Association

Palm Beach International Film Festival

Phoenix Film Critics Society Awards

Radio Music Awards

Screen Actors Guild Awards
Lauded by critics for its style, simplicity and genuine warmth, the Screen Actors Guild Awards, which made its debut in 1995, has become one of the industry's most prized honors. The only televised awards shows to exclusively honor performers, it presents thirteen awards for acting in film and television in a fast moving two-hour show which airs live on TNT and TBS. The awards focus on both individual performances as well as on the work of the entire ensemble of a drama series and comedy series, and the cast of a motion picture. Mya has won one award.

Soul Train Music Awards

The Soul Train Music Awards is an annual award show aired in national broadcast syndication that honors the best in African American music and entertainment established in 1987.

Source Hip-Hop Music Awards

Teen Choice Awards

The Teen Choice Awards is an awards show presented annually by the Fox Broadcasting Company. The program honors the year's biggest achievements in music, movies, sports, television, fashion and more, as voted on by teens aged 13–19. Mya has won one award from two nominations.

Titan Arts Awards
{| class="wikitable plainrowheaders" style="width:85%;"
|-
! scope="col" style="width:4%;"| Year
! scope="col" style="width:35%;"| Nominated work
! scope="col" style="width:50%;"| Category
! scope="col" style="width:6%;"| Result
! scope="col" style="width:6%;"| 
|-
|align="center" | 2017 || Herself || Icon of the Year ||  ||
|-

Washington Area Music Awards

The Washington Area Music Association recognize significant career achievements by area musicians. Nominations and balloting come from the WAMA membership. Mya has won eight awards from twenty-five nominations.

ZAZ Awards (South Africa)

References

External links

Mya
Mýa